The Manitoba Games are a multi-sport event in Manitoba, Canada held once every two years and are organized by Sport Manitoba. The event has two different seasonal events, the winter games and summer games. The event consists of teams held from all regions of the province. The teams include Winnipeg, Parkland, Eastman, Westman, Northern, and Interlake. The first event was held in Winnipeg in 1974.

According to Sport Manitoba, the 2022 Manitoba Games which were scheduled to take place in Niverville, Manitoba from February 27 to March 5, 2022 have been cancelled due to covid-19.

Sports
Some of the sports on the program include:

Summer sports
Summer games include baseball, softball, soccer, football, and others.

A total of ? sports are a part of the Manitoba Summer Games and include the following:

 
 
 
  Canadian Football

Winter sports

Winter games include ice hockey, ringette, curling, and others.

A total of ? sports are a part of the Manitoba Winter Games and include the following:

 
 
  Ringette

List of events and hosts by year

The first Manitoba Games were held in 1974 in Winnipeg and was the Winter session. The Manitoba Games were not held between 1980 to 1984.

The 2022 Manitoba Games which were scheduled to take place in Niverville, Manitoba from February 27 to March 5, 2022 have been cancelled due to covid-19.

Manitoba Summer Games

Manitoba Winter Games

See also
Canada Games
Canada Summer Games
Canada Winter Games
Western Canada Summer Games
BC Games
BC Summer Games
BC Winter Games
Alberta Winter Games
Saskatchewan Games
Ontario Games
Quebec Games

References

External links
Official site

Sports competitions in Manitoba